The 2009–10 Liga Nacional de Básquet season was the 26th season of the top professional basketball league in Argentina. The regular season started on 7 October 2009. Peñarol won their second title, defeating Atenas in the finals.

Promotions and relegations
Torneo Nacional de Ascenso Champions from the previous season La Unión and runners-up Unión de Sunchales were promoted, occupying the berths left by Ben Hur and Monte Hermoso. Central Enterriano, also from the second-tier tournament, traded places with Independiente de Neuquén, who had to sell their berth due to financial difficulties.

Clubs

Regular season

First stage
The first stage took place between 7 October and 25 November 2009. Teams were divided into two zones. The top three teams from each zone plus the best fourth team overall and a wildcard competed in the Torneo Súper 8 that took place in December.

North Zone

South Zone

Torneo Súper 8
The sixth edition of Torneo Súper 8 took place on 17–20 December 2009 in the city of Mar del Plata. Peñarol won their second title, defeating Atenas in the Final.

Second stage
The second stage started on 27 November 2010. All 16 teams were ranked together. Each team carried over half of the points obtained in the first stage.

Playoffs

Championship playoffs
The Playoffs started on 31 March 2011 and ended on 25 May 2011. Peñarol defeated Atenas in the Finals.

Relegation playoffs
The relegation series began on 2 April. Central Entrerriano and Quilmes lost their respective series and were relegated to the Torneo Nacional de Ascenso.

Clubs in international competitions

Awards

Yearly Awards
Most Valuable Player: Leonardo Gutiérrez, Peñarol
All-Tournament Team:
 F Leonardo Gutiérrez, Peñarol
 F Juan Locatelli, Atenas
 C Román González, Quimsa
 G Juan Pablo Figueroa, Atenas
 G David Jackson, Libertad

References
LNB Media Guide 2016/2017, laliganacional.com.ar. Retrieved 16 May 2017.

Liga Nacional de Básquet seasons
Argentina